The Battle of Niagara may refer to:
 Fort Niagara, a fort used in the American Revolutionary War, the Seven Years' War, and the War of 1812.
 The Battle of Fort Niagara of the Seven Years' War, taking place in July 1759.
 The Capture of Fort Niagara of the War of 1812, taking place in December 1813.
 The Battle of Lundy's Lane also called the Battle of Niagara, of the War of 1812, taking place in July 1814.
 "Battle of Niagara," an 1818 poem by John Neal